Matthew Silva (born 15 March 1970) is a Welsh rugby union coach, who is the current coach of RGC 1404. He is a former rugby union and professional rugby league footballer, who played from the 1980s to the 2000s. In rugby union (RU), he played as a number eight, fly-half, centre, wing and fullback.

As a player, he played club level rugby union for St Albans RFC (Cardiff), Llandaff RFC, Newport RFC, Pontypool RFC, Newbridge RFC, West Hartlepool R.F.C., Cardiff RFC, Treorchy RFC, Rumney RFC and Llantwit Major RFC. He played club level rugby league for Halifax, and representative level for Wales.

As a coach, he has coached club level rugby union for Llantwit Major RFC, Beddau RFC, Rumney RFC, Cardiff Blues Under-16, Under-18, Under-20s and Bridgend Ravens. From 2005 to 2013, he was the Welsh Rugby Union/Cardiff Blues Player Development Officer for the Vale of Glamorgan. From 2013 to 2015, he was Director of Rugby at Cowbridge Comprehensive School and was responsible for establishing the Rugby Academy that competes in the Welsh Rugby Union National Colleges League. In 2015, he became the Welsh Rugby Union and Ospreys Coach Development Officer.

Background
Matthew Silva was born in Tremorfa, Cardiff, Wales.

Playing career

International honours
Silva represented Wales (RU) at Under-19s, Under-21s, and Wales 'B', and won a cap for Wales (RL) while at Halifax in the 68-0 victory over Papua New Guinea at Vetch Field, Swansea on Thursday 17 October 1991.

Notable tour matches
Silva toured Canada with Newport RFC in 1988, played for Pontypool RFC against the touring All Blacks in 1989, and toured Africa with Pontypool RFC in 1989, playing against Kenya.

Rugby union club career
Silva began playing rugby aged 7 at St Albans RFC as a number eight, he played and scored a try in Cardiff schools Under-11s 8–4 victory over Bridgend schools Under-11s in the DC Thomas cup final at Cardiff Arms Park. He ended his playing career aged 39 as a player-coach at Llantwit Major RFC as a fly-half. His goal kicking statistics are 2674 points in league and cup games.

Rugby league club career
Silva was signed to Halifax by Peter Roe, he broke his leg in the 20–27 defeat by Salford in the Second Division Premiership Trophy Final at Old Trafford on 12 May 1991, and subsequently left Halifax after Roger Millward became coach.

Coaching career
Silva began his player-coaching role aged 31 at Llantwit Major RFC. He later went on to coach Rumney RFC of the WRU Division One East league, and while backs coach of the Cardiff Blues, their Under-16s, Under-16, Under-18, and team Under-20s. He also coached Old Illtydians RFC, a feeder club of the Blues and his former high school team.

In May 2016, Silva was appointed as the new coach of Bridgend Ravens, succeeding Mike Hook. On 11 May 2019, Bridgend survived relegation from the Welsh Premiership, with a 34–31 victory over Pontypridd RFC. On 24 June, Silva was sacked by Bridgend, following a change of management at the club.

On 18 July 2019, Silva was appointed as the new coach of RGC 1404, succeeding Mark Jones. On 1 December, he took a leave of absence due to personal reasons.

References

External links
Statistics at statbunker.com
Silva's path to golden future
(archived by web.archive.org) St. Albans RFC website

1970 births
Living people
Cardiff RFC players
Halifax R.L.F.C. players
Llandaff RFC players
Llantwit Major RFC players
Newbridge RFC players
Newport RFC players
Pontypool RFC players
Rugby league fullbacks
Rugby league players from Cardiff
Rugby union centres
Rugby union fly-halves
Rugby union fullbacks
Rugby union number eights
Rugby union players from Cardiff
Rugby union wings
Rumney RFC players
Treorchy RFC players
Wales national rugby league team players
Welsh rugby league players
Welsh rugby union players
West Hartlepool R.F.C. players